Submyotodon is a genus of vespertilionid bats, published as a new taxon in 2003 to describe a Miocene fossil species. Extant species and subspecies previously included in Myotis were later transferred to this genus. Species in this genus are referred to as broad-muzzled bats or broad-muzzled myotises.

Taxonomy and etymology
Submyotodon was described as a new genus of bat in 2003, based on fossil specimens found near Eichstätt, Germany.
The type species is Submyotodon petersbuchensis.
The genus name Submyotodon is from the Latin prefix  ('under' or 'close to'), + the Greek roots  ('mouse') +  ('ear') +  ('tooth'). This refers to the fact that its molars are similar to those of the mouse-eared bats, e.g. "myotodont" molars.
Myotodont molars are characterized by a postcristid (enamel ridge linking the hypoconid and hypoconulid) that links to the entoconid (inner posterior cusp of a molar).

Submyotodon is the second extant genus included in the subfamily Myotinae. Before the description of Submyotodon and analysis of its phylogenetics, the only member of Myotinae was the genus Myotis.

Species

Extant 

 Submyotodon caliginosus (Tomes, 1859) - Himalayan broad-muzzled bat
 Submyotodon latirostris (Kishida, 1932) - Taiwan broad-muzzled bat
 Submyotodon moupinensis (Milne-Edwards, 1872) - Moupin broad-muzzled bat

Fossil 

 Submyotodon petersbuchensis Ziegler, 2003

Range
The extinct S. petersbuchensis was discovered in Germany.
The three extant species are found in Asia, including Taiwan, India, and China.

References

Submyotodon
Bat genera
Extant Miocene first appearances